Deonna "Dee" Davis (born November 8, 1984) is a retired professional basketball player.

High school 

Born in Cincinnati, Ohio, Davis played for Princeton High School  in Sharonville, Ohio, where she was named a WBCA All-American. She participated in the 2003 WBCA High School All-America Game.

Vanderbilt statistics 

Source

WNBA career 

Davis was selected by the Houston Comets with the fourteenth pick of The 2007 WNBA Draft but was
released in six games of the 2007 season averaging 2.0 points per game.

References

External links 

 Vanderbilt Commodores bio

1984 births
Living people
American women's basketball players
Basketball players from Cincinnati
Houston Comets players
McDonald's High School All-Americans
Parade High School All-Americans (girls' basketball)
Point guards
Vanderbilt Commodores women's basketball players